Each "article" in this category is a collection of entries about several stamp issuers, presented in alphabetical order. The entries are formulated on the micro model and so provide summary information about all known issuers.

See the :Category:Compendium of postage stamp issuers page for details of the project.

UAE 

Refer 	United Arab Emirates (UAE)

UAR 

Refer 	United Arab Republic (UAR)

Ubangi-Shari 

Refer 	Oubangui-Chari

Ubangi-Shari-Chad 

Refer 	Oubangui-Chari-Tchad

Uganda 

Dates 	1962 –
Capital 	Kampala
Currency 	100 cents = 1 shilling

Main Article Postage stamps and postal history of Uganda

See also 	British East Africa;
		Kenya Uganda & Tanzania (Combined Issues)

Uganda Protectorate 

Dates 	1895 – 1902
Capital 	Entebbe
Currency 	(1895) 1000 cowries = 2 rupees
		(1896) 16 annas = 1 rupee

Refer 	British East Africa

United Kingdom 

Refer 	United Kingdom (UK)

Ukraine 

Dates 	1992 –
Capital 	Kyiv
Currency 	(1992) karbovanets (coupon currency)
		(1996) 100 kopiykas = 1 hyrvnia

Main Article Postage stamps and postal history of Ukraine

Includes 	Ukraine (pre–Soviet);
		Ukrainian Field Post;
		Donetsk People's Republic

See also 	Union of Soviet Socialist Republics (USSR)

Ukraine (pre-Soviet) 

Dates 	1918 – 1923
Capital 	Kiev
Currency 	200 shahiv = 100 kopecks = 1 Russian ruble

Refer 	Ukraine

Ukraine (German Occupation) 

Dates 	1941 – 1944
Currency 	100 pfennige = 1 mark

Refer 	German Occupation Issues (WW2)

Ukrainian Field Post 

Dates 	1920 only
Currency 	100 shahiv = 1 grivna

Refer 	Ukraine

UKTT 

Refer 	Southern Cameroons

Ultramar 

Refer 	Cuba;
		Macao;
		Portuguese Guinea;
		Puerto Rico;
		Spanish Guinea

Umm Al Qiwain 

Dates 	1964 – 1967
Currency  	(1964) 100 naye paise = 1 rupee
		(1967) 100 dirhams = 1 riyal

Refer 	Trucial States

UN 

Refer 	United Nations (UN)

UN Administration of West New Guinea 

Refer 	West New Guinea

UNESCO 

Dates 	1961 – 1981
Currency 	100 centimes = 1 franc

Refer 	International Organisations

Union Island 

Refer 	Grenadines of St Vincent

Union Islands 

Refer 	Tokelau

Union of Soviet Socialist Republics (USSR) 

Dates 	1923 – 1992
Capital 	Moscow
Currency 	100 kopecks = 1 Soviet ruble

Main Article Needed 

Includes 	USSR Issues for the Far East

See also 	Armenia;
		Azerbaijan;
		Belarus;
		Estonia;
		Georgia;
		Kazakhstan;
		Kyrgyzstan;
		Latvia;
		Lithuania;
		Moldova;
		Russia;
		Tajikistan;
		Transcaucasian Federation;
		Turkmenistan;
		Ukraine;
		Uzbekistan

United Arab Emirates (UAE) 

Dates 	1973 –
Capital  	Abu Dhabi
Currency  	100 fils = 1 dirham

Main Article Postage stamps and postal history of the United Arab Emirates

See also 	Abu Dhabi;
		Dubai;
		Trucial States

United Arab Republic (UAR) 

Dates 	1958 – 1961
Capital  	Cairo
Currency  	1000 milliemes = 100 piastres = 1 pound

Refer 	Egypt

United Kingdom (UK) 

This was historically called the United Kingdom of Great Britain and Ireland (1801–1922) after which it became the United Kingdom of Great Britain and Northern Ireland or UK for short.

It has never been a philatelic term, any more than England has, because the worldwide consensus among philatelists and postal authorities has been that the issuer of British stamps is called Great Britain.

Refer 	Great Britain
	Great Britain (Regional issues)

United Kingdom Trust Territory (UKTT) 

Refer 	Southern Cameroons

United Nations (UN) 

Dates 	1951 –
Currency 	American, Austrian or Swiss depending on location

Refer 	International Organisations

United States 

Dates 	1847 –
Capital 	Washington, D.C.
Currency 	100 cents = 1 dollar

See also 	Confederate States of America

United States of New Granada 

Refer 	New Granada

Universal Postal Union (UPU) 

Dates 	1957 –
Currency 	100 centimes = 1 franc (Swiss)

Refer 	International Organisations

Upper Senegal & Niger 

Dates 	1906 – 1921
Capital 	Niamey
Currency 	100 centimes = 1 franc

Refer 	French Soudan

Upper Silesia 

Dates 	1920 – 1922
Currency 	100 pfennige = 1 mark

Refer 	Plebiscite Issues

Upper Volta 

Dates 	1959 – 1984
Capital 	Ouagadougou
Currency 	100 centimes = 1 franc

Main Article Needed 

Includes 	Upper Volta (French Colony)

See also 	Burkina Faso;
		French West Africa

Upper Volta (French Colony) 

Dates 	1920 – 1933
Capital 	Ouagadougou
Currency 	100 centimes = 1 franc

Refer 	Upper Volta

Upper Yafa 

Dates 	1967 only
Currency  	1000 fils = 1 dinar

Refer  	Aden Protectorate States

UPU 

Refer 	Universal Postal Union (UPU)

Uruguay 

Dates 	1856 –
Capital 	Montevideo
Currency 	(1856) 120 centavos = 1 real
		(1859) 1000 milesimos = 100 centesimos = 1 peso
		(1975) 100 old pesos = 1 new peso

Main Article Postage stamps and postal history of Uruguay

United States 

Refer 	United States of America (USA)

US Post Abroad 

Main Article Needed 

Includes 	Guam;
		Philippines (US Administration);
		Shanghai (US Postal Agency);
		US Post Offices in Japan

US Postal Agency in Shanghai 

Refer 	Shanghai (US Postal Agency)

US Post Offices in Japan 

Dates 	1867 – 1874
Currency 	100 cents = 1 dollar

Refer 	US Post Abroad

USSR 
Refer 	Union of Soviet Socialist Republics (USSR)
Main Article Stamps of the Soviet Union

USSR Issues for the Far East 

Dates 	1923 only
Currency 	100 kopecks = 1 Soviet ruble

Refer 	Union of Soviet Socialist Republics (USSR)
Main Article Postage stamps and postal history of the Far Eastern Republic

US Virgin Islands 

Refer 	Danish West Indies

Uzbekistan 

Dates 	1992 –
Capital 	Tashkent
Currency 	(1992) 100 kopecks = 1 Soviet rouble
		(June 1994) suom (coupon currency)
		(Sept 1994) 100 tyin = 1 soum

Main Article Postage stamps and postal history of Uzbekistan

See also 	Union of Soviet Socialist Republics (USSR)

References

Bibliography
 Stanley Gibbons Ltd, Europe and Colonies 1970, Stanley Gibbons Ltd, 1969
 Stanley Gibbons Ltd, various catalogues
 Stuart Rossiter & John Flower, The Stamp Atlas, W H Smith, 1989
 XLCR Stamp Finder and Collector's Dictionary, Thomas Cliffe Ltd, c.1960

External links
 AskPhil – Glossary of Stamp Collecting Terms
 Encyclopaedia of Postal History

Ua